The final of the Men's discus throw event at the 1998 European Championships in Budapest, Hungary was held on August 23, 1998. There were a total number of 31 participating athletes. The qualifying rounds were held on August 22, with the standard mark needed to reach the final set at 63.00 metres.

Medalists

Schedule
All times are Central European Time (UTC+1)

Qualification

Group A

Group B

Final

See also
 1995 Men's World Championships Discus Throw (Gothenburg)
 1996 Men's Olympic Discus Throw (Atlanta)
 1997 Men's World Championships Discus Throw (Athens)
 1999 Men's World Championships Discus Throw (Seville)
 2000 Men's Olympic Discus Throw (Sydney)
 2001 Men's World Championships Discus Throw (Edmonton)

References
 Results
 todor66
 Results European Championships Athletic 1934-2010 

Discus throw
Discus throw at the European Athletics Championships